Hail Storm Hill, also known as Cowpe Moss, is the highest point of the Rossendale Valley, England, an area of moorland and hill country situated between the West Pennine Moors and the South Pennines. It is wholly within Lancashire, although the administrative county boundary with the Metropolitan Borough of Rochdale passes just a kilometre to the south-east of the summit.

Scout Moor Wind Farm now spans Hail Storm Hill.

The Forest of Rossendale also contains the Marilyn of Freeholds Top and the summit of Great Hameldon.

Ascents
The hill can also be climbed from Rawtenstall to the north-west.

The hill is crossed by three long-distance footpaths: the Pennine Bridleway passes just to the north of the summit, the Rossendale Way goes over the western shoulder and the Rochdale Way passes over Knowl Moor two miles (3 km) to the south.

References

Mountains and hills of Lancashire
Marilyns of England
Geography of the Borough of Rossendale